4-Methylphenethylamine (4MPEA), also known as para-methylphenethylamine, is an organic compound with the chemical formula of .  4MPEA is a human trace amine associated receptor 1 (TAAR1) agonist, a property which it shares with its monomethylated phenethylamine isomers, such as amphetamine (α-methylphenethylamine), and  (a trace amine).  4MPEA also appears to inhibit the human cytochrome P450 enzymes CYP1A2 and CYP2A6, based upon the published literature.

References

Phenethylamines
TAAR1 agonists